The California state elections, June 2008 were held on June 3, 2008, throughout California. The elections included two ballot propositions and one recall election for a State Senate seat. All primary elections for Californian seats to the House of Representatives, all of the seats of the State Assembly, and all odd-numbered seats of the State Senate were also held.

Propositions

Proposition 98 
Proposition 98 would have been a constitutional amendment that limited eminent domain and gradually eliminated rent control.

Proposition 99 
Proposition 99 was a constitutional amendment that limited eminent domain and government acquisition of owner-occupied residences.

12th State Senate district recall election 
In response to his actions involving the state budget, a petition to recall State Senator Jeff Denham, a Republican who represents California's 12th State Senate district, was circulated. In the election his successor was to be determined, if a majority of voters favored the recall. As it happened, the majority did not and he remained in office.

See also
February 2008 California elections

References

External links 
State Senate District 12 recall election

 
California 06